Johannes Chan Man-mun (陳文敏) SC (Hon) is an Adjunct Professor, former Chair Professor of Law (–2021) and former Dean of the Faculty of Law (2002–2014) at the University of Hong Kong. He specialises in human rights, constitutional and administrative law, and is the first and only academic silk ever appointed in Hong Kong.  He is credited with transforming the University's Faculty of Law into one of the leading law schools in the world during his tenure as Dean.

In February 2009, he was banned from entering Macau to give a public lecture, which raised strong responses from both pan-democracy and pro-Beijing parties. In 2015, he was unanimously recommended by a search committee to become the Pro-Vice-Chancellor of the University of Hong Kong, but the recommendation was, exceptionally, not accepted by the University Council; the decision was widely criticised as being an interference with academic freedom, as it was believed to be prompted by Chan's outspoken and liberal political stance.

Early life
Chan was born and educated in Hong Kong. He earned his LLB from the University of Hong Kong and his LLM at the London School of Economics and Political Science.

Career
Chan was called to the Hong Kong Bar in September 1982, specialising in public law and human rights. He has appeared as counsel in many leading constitutional law cases, covering a wide spectrum of issues such as free speech, fair trial, election and social welfare rights. In 2003, he was appointed the first Honorary Senior Counsel in Hong Kong, and remains so far the only academic silk in Hong Kong.

Chan joined the University of Hong Kong as a lecturer in 1985, became a Professor in 1998, the Head of Department of Law in 1999–2002, and the Dean of the Faculty of Law in 2002–2014. During his deanship he has led the transformation of the Faculty of Law of the University of Hong Kong from a local teaching law school to one of the leading global law schools which has consistently been ranked within the top 20 law schools in the world. He is one of the pioneers in offering a common law training programme to train judges and legal officers of the Mainland, and together with UCL and Peking University, he introduced a series of rule of law programmes in the Mainland.

Under his leadership, the Human Rights programme has been significantly expanded and has since 1999 trained graduates from many Asian countries. He has built up strong and strategic academic and research relations with leading law schools worldwide.

Chan is also a leading academic and has published widely in the field. His book, Law of the Hong Kong Constitution, is a leading treatise on the unique constitution of One Country, Two Systems, in Hong Kong. According to declassified documents at the Public Records Office in 2018, one of his early articles on A Bill of Rights for Hong Kong has significantly influenced the thinking of the UK Foreign and Commonwealth Office and shaped the final format of the Hong Kong Bill of Rights 1991.

Chan has also been an outspoken critic on legal affairs. He was a founding member of the Article 23 Concern Group and Article 45 Concern Group, and has been at the forefront of efforts to oppose the HKSAR Government's bid to pass a national security law in 2003, one that was eventually withdrawn after half a million people took to the streets in protest. He was one of the founders of Hong Kong Human Rights Monitor. Internationally, he has worked on specific issues with many non-governmental organisations such as Amnesty International, Lawyers Committee, the International Committee of the Red Cross and Article 19.

Chan has served on many government/public and professional bodies, including the Bar Council, the Consumer Council, the Broadcasting Authority, the Press Council, the Administrative Appeals Board, the Municipal Services Appeals Board, the Law Reform Sub-Committee on Privacy, the Council of the Hong Kong Red Cross, and the Central Policy Unit of the Hong Kong Government.  He has served on the Consumer Council for 12 years and was the chairman of its Consumer Legal Action Fund for 6 years until 2010, during which time he oversaw, among other things, a test case involving the collapse of Lehman Brothers.  In 1995, he was elected as one of the Ten Young Outstanding Persons in Hong Kong. In 1997, he received the Badge of Honour from the British Red Cross Society for his distinguished service. Since 2012, he has worked with the former Chief Secretary Anson Chan on democratic development in Hong Kong and is a core member of Hong Kong 2020, established by Anson Chan.

In August 2018, Chan received a two-year contract extension, rather than the five years that he had applied for. It was reported that Hong Kong University did not give a substantial reason for the decision; a university spokesperson pointing to the "robust evaluation-approval process" applying to appointments beyond retirement age, which Chan had sought. In July 2021, the South China Morning Post reported that Chan's contract as professor would not be renewed, while he would continue to serve as adjunct professor at the university.

Denied entry by Macau
On 27 February 2009, Chan was invited to give a public lecture on the right to a fair trial at the University of Macau.  Under the newly enacted Macau national security law, he was not allowed to enter Macau. The ban was widely reported internationally and the Macau Government was criticised for interfering with freedom of expression and academic freedom.  Chan believed the ban was related to his role in the Article 23 concern group in 2003 when he was among the loudest critics of the National Security Bill introduced by the HKSAR Government, since the visit fell on the week that the Macau Legislature adopted its National Security Law. . Chan had no difficulty visiting Mainland China or Taiwan. The only explanation given by Macau officials on the ban was that his name was on a stop list and that they were just doing their job. Legislator Nelson Wong said "it seems that Hong Kong lawmakers, journalists and academics are inferior to gamblers, sex tourists and loan sharks." Ronny Tong said it would be better for Hong Kong people not to travel to Macau (casinos) for entertainment. Pro-Beijing camp Regina Ip said the SAR government must react since it affects the human rights of citizens. Albert Ho called on the Hong Kong government to stop allowing Macau senior officials from entering Hong Kong if they continued to turn away pro-democracy politicians. Chief Executive of Macau Edmund Ho said that his officials had acted according to the law. He personally believed it has nothing to do with the legislation of Article 23. Casino tycoon Stanley Ho said "those who were barred deserved what they got".

Pro-vice-chancellor selection controversy

Thought to be front-runner for the post of pro-vice-chancellor for staffing and resources of the University of Hong Kong, and having been unanimously recommended by a search committee of the University in November 2014, Chan was criticised in Wen Wei Po and Ta Kung Pao, two pro-China newspapers, for his liberal pro-democracy stance. Wen Wei Po, citing from a then embargoed University Grants Commission report, stated that the HKU Law Faculty had lost its leading research position to Chinese University of Hong Kong when Chan was the Dean of the Law School. The pro-China newspapers accused Chan of allowing the Faculty to be too involved in politics and for not taking steps to prevent his staff Associate Professor Benny Tai from carrying out the turbulent civic movement of Occupy Central. For the following nine months Chan was subject to extensive public attacks by the pro-establishment media.  When the University Grants Commission Report was published, it showed that HKU Law Faculty lost only by a small margin in the research assessment exercise 2014 and HKU has a much larger number of returnable staff than CUHK. According to an article written by Kevin Lau in Ming Pao, parties close to the government applied pressure on committee members behind the scenes to block Chan's appointment. Chief Executive Leung Chun-ying has been reported to have telephoned members of the committee to persuade them to vote against Chan's appointment, whilst Sophia Kao, member of the Central Policy Unit, admitted that she may have mentioned Chan's candidature to someone "casually" but said she did not recall with whom and in what context. CY Leung's lieutenant Fanny Law, who was found to have interfered with institutional autonomy in 2007 whilst she was Education Secretary, categorically denied having intervened. Leung also denied allegations he intervened in the selection.

The council was criticised when it repeatedly deferred the decision to appoint Chan, stating that it should wait until a new provost was in place. The decision was repeatedly delayed through votes on 30 June and 28 July. On 29 September 2015, the council rejected Chan's appointment (by 12 votes to 8) through a secret ballot in a closed meeting; no reason for the decision was provided. Subsequent leakage of the discussions at the council meeting suggested that the reasons for rejection had nothing to do with the merits of his appointment. HKU successfully obtained an injunction restraining publications of such leaked information.

Comments on mourning police stabbing perpetrator
Broadcaster RTHK reported that on 4 July 2021, Chan had said any suggestions that laying flowers to mourn the death of the attacker Leung Kin-fai of the July 1 police stabbing might be illegal were far-fetched. He said people might be mourning the death of Leung out of sympathy or expressing discontent with the government, which was very different from terrorism. Former Commissioner of Police Chris Tang condemned Chan sharply, saying: "I hope that this law professor can sleep at night", and warned of possible "bloodshed" in the city as a result of Chan's comments.

Major Books Edited and Authored
 2018: "Paths of Justice" (HKU Press) 
 2015:  "Law of the Hong Kong Constitution"(Sweet & Maxwell)(2nd edition; edition 2011) (with CL Lim)
 2015:  "General Principles of Hong Kong Law (Joint Publisher, in Chinese, 3rd edition; 2nd ed 2009; 1st ed, 1999)'' (with Albert Chen & others)
 2015: "Constitutional Law and Human Rights"(Sweet & Maxwell, Halsbury's Laws of Hong Kong Special Issue (with the Hon Justice K Bokhary and others)
 2004:  "Immigration Law in Hong Kong" (Sweet & Maxwell) (with Bart Rwezaura)
 2000: "Hong Kong's Constitutional Debate: Conflict over Interpretation" (HKU Press) (with Fu Hualing and Yash Ghai)
 2000:  "On the Road to Justice" (in Chinese): 
 1995: "Media Law and Practice" (Commercial Press, in Chinese) (with Kenneth Leung)
 1993: "The Hong Kong Bill of Rights: A Comparative Approach" (Butterworths)(with Yash Ghai)
 1993: "Public Law and Human Rights: A Hong Kong Sourcebook" (Butterworths)(with Andrew Byrnes)
 1990: "Human Rights in Hong Kong" (in Chinese)

Awards
 Human Rights Press Award, 1999

See also
 Politics of Hong Kong
 Politics of Macau

References

External links
 Faculty of Law, HKU homepage: Chan, Johannes Man Mun

Alumni of the University of Hong Kong
Alumni of St. John's College, University of Hong Kong
Alumni of the London School of Economics
Hong Kong legal scholars
Hong Kong Senior Counsel
Academic staff of the University of Hong Kong
Living people
Year of birth missing (living people)